These are the official results of the Women's Discus Throw event at the 1993 IAAF World Championships in Stuttgart, Germany. There were a total number of 34 participating athletes, with two qualifying groups and the final held on Thursday August 19, 1993. The qualification mark was set at 62.50 metres.

Medalists

Schedule
All times are Central European Time (UTC+1)

Abbreviations
All results shown are in metres

Qualifying round
Held on Tuesday 1993-08-17

Final

See also
 1990 Women's European Championships Discus Throw (Split)
 1992 Women's Olympic Discus Throw (Barcelona)
 1994 Women's European Championships Discus Throw (Helsinki)

References
 Results
 IAAF

D
Discus throw at the World Athletics Championships
1993 in women's athletics